Ahmad al-Muhajir (260-345 AH or c. 873-956 CE) also known as Al-Imām Aḥmad bin ʿĪsā was an Imam Mujtahid and the progenitor of Ba 'Alawi sada group which is instrumental in spreading Islam to India, Southeast Asia and Africa. He was the son of ‘Isa the son Muhammad the son of Ali al-Uraydi who was the fourth son of Imam Ja'far al-Sadiq, a fifth generation descendant of Ali and Fatima, the daughter of Muhammad. He was a known acquaintance of Bishr al-Ḥāfī.

Early life
His full name is Aḥmad ibn Isa Ar-Rumi ibn Muḥammad An-Naqib ibn 'Alī al-ʿUrayḍī ibn Ja'far al-Sadiq ibn Muhammad al-Baqir ibn Ali Zayn al-Abidin ibn al-Husayn ibn Ali ibn Abu Talib. According to another history, he is thought to have been born in 241 Hijrah (820 CE).

Imam Aḥmad grew up under the supervision of his parents in an environment surrounded by scholars and living examples of prophetic character.  He memorized the Qur'an and then mastered the sciences of the sacred law until he reached the rank mujtahid.  He also had his own hadith collection (musnad, not to be confused with Musnad Ahmad) and was held in great esteem by the Sunni Imam Al-Tabari.

Migration
Al-Imam Aḥmad ibn Isa is called al-Muhâjir (emigrant) because he left Basra, Iraq during the Abbasid Caliphate that was headquartered in Baghdad in the year 317H (929 CE). His inner sight allowed him to witness the calamities and tribulations that would take place in Iraq.  He realized the greatness of the sacred trust that he was carrying in his loins.

Aḥmad ibn Isa left Basra with his wife, his son, Abd Allah, (who preferred to be known as Ubayd Allah) and his grandson from Ubayd Allah (Basri, who was born in Basra).  With them also was Sharif Muḥammad ibn Sulayman, the grandfather of the Ahdal family and Sharif Aḥmad al-Qudaymi, the grandfather of the Qudaymi family, and a group of 70 people.  He left his other three sons Muḥammad, Ali and Husayn in Iraq to take care of their wealth and property.

He first went to Medina and Mecca, and then from Mecca to Yemen in around 319 H. He migrated at a time when there was much internal strife, bloodshed and confusion in Iraq, where a large number of the descendants of Muhammad were persecuted for political reasons by the ruling Abbasids and also because there was turmoil due to revolt against Abbasids ruling by members of the Qaramita.

He set out for Yemen in 319 H with his party and eventually reach Hadhramaut, while Aḥmad al-Qudaymi settled in northern Yemen and Sharif Muḥammad ibn Sulayman in Tihama on  the Red Sea coast.  He first settled in the village of Jubayl and then Hajrayn.  Next he traveled to the village Qarat Bani Jushayr and finally settled in al-Husayyisah near Seiyun.

Later life and death
Imam al-Muhâjir arrived in Hadhramaut at a time when an offshoot of the Kharijite sect called Ibadiyyah held political power and had widespread influence throughout the valley.  He persevered in the spreading of Islamic truths until he almost single-handedly removed the Ibadi sect from Hadhramaut without ever taking up arms against them.

He died in 345 H or 956 CE (another version said he died in 307 H or 924 CE) in al-Husaisah, a town between Tarim and Seiyun, Hadhramaut. His shrine stands on a hill and is among the first shrines that visitors to Hadhramaut pay their respects to when visiting the area.

School of thought
There is a controversy about what Madhhab followed by Aḥmad ibn ʻIsa. Most ulama (Islamic scholars) have the opinion that he was a Sunni imam. Some other ulama such as Imam ʻAbd al-Raḥman ibn ʻUbayd Allah al-Saqqāf, Habib Ṣalih al-Ḥamid, and Sayyid ʻAbd Allah ibn Ṭāhir al-Ḥaddād (brother of Habib Alwi bin Thahir al-Haddad, Mufti of Johor) and some others contend that he was a Shi'a Zaydi follower. However the majority of his descendants followed Sunni Islam.

Regarding what Madhab of law he followed, Habib Abd al-Rahman ibn Ubayd Allah al-Saqqaf emphasized that al-Muhâjir was not Sunni Shafi'i in fiqh (jurisprudence), as Imam Aḥmad ibn Isa is a Mujtahid, he does not need to follow any madhhabs.

Descendants and status
At first the term Alawi is given to all descendants of Ali ibn Abi Talib, both of his al-Hasan and al-Husayn. Later, to distinguish the descent of Alawi ibn Ubayd Allah,  the title Aal Bani Alawi is then used.

The Sayyids from the family of Ba 'Alawi sada of Yemen trace their descent to Aḥmad al-Muhâjir through his grandson, Alawi "Sahib al-Sumul" ibn Ubayd Allah.  Some of the Nine Saints of Java or Wali Sanga in Indonesia in some traditions are claimed to be descendants of him as well.  Alawi son of Ubayd Allah or also known as Alawi al-Awwal (The first Alawi) was the first of his descendants to be born in Yemen (one version says he was born in al-Husaisa, another version says he was born in Sumul)  The word Bā in Ba 'Alawi sada is a strict Hadhrami term meaning the descendants of..

Currently, descendants of Imam Aḥmad through Alawi ibn Ubayd Allah spread out mostly in Yemen, Africa, Southeast Asian countriesBenadir(mostly in Indonesia, Malaysia, Brunei, some in Singapore, South Philippines and a few in Thailand), and South Asian countries (Pakistan and India). Some of the prominent descendants of Imam Aḥmad are Imam Muhammad al-Faqih al-Muqaddam in the 13th century, Sayyid Abu Bakr al-Aydarus of Tarim and Azmatkhan in India, Sunan Ampel in Indonesia in 15th century,  Imam Abd Allah ibn Alawi al-Haddad in the 17th century, Raden Saleh bin Yahya  (an aristocrat and an artist) in the 19th century  Haidar Abu Bakr al-Attas (former prime minister of Yemen), Habib Umar bin Hafiz of Tarim, Habib Ali al-Jifri of Jeddah in 21st century.  Some of his descendants in Indonesia, among others, are Sayyid Abdullah Al-Aidarus, Habib Ali Kwitang, Ali Alatas, Alwi Shihab, and Hamid Algadri.

Imam Aḥmad al-Muhâjir is an Imam Mujtahid, which means he is regarded as a primary source for rulings on religious matters.

See also
Tomb of Aḥmad al-Muhâjir

References

Footnotes

Bibliography

 
 
 
 
 
 
 
 
 
 
 
 

Islamic history of Yemen
Sunni imams
870s births
956 deaths
Year of birth uncertain
Hadhrami people
9th-century people from the Abbasid Caliphate
10th-century people from the Abbasid Caliphate
9th-century Arabs
10th-century Arabs